HDMS Narhvalen (S320) was the lead ship of her class of submarine for the Royal Danish Navy. She was built to the German Type 205 design at the naval dockyard in Copenhagen where she was laid down on 16 February 1965. She was launched on 10 September 1968, and was commissioned into the Royal Danish Navy on 27 February 1970. In 1994, Narhvalen and sister ship  were modified to bring their technical performance more in line with the Royal Danish Navy's newer . Narhvalen was decommissioned on 16 October 2003.

References 
 
 

Narhvalen-class submarines
Ships built in Copenhagen
1968 ships